Rajeewa Jayaweera (also known as Rajiv Jayaweera) was a Sri Lankan newspaper columnist.

Early life and education 
He was the son of diplomat, Stanley Jayaweera, and the nephew of Neville Jayaweera.
Rajeewa was educated at Nalanda College, Colombo. Rajeewa graduated from the School of Economics for Catering and Trade in Dortmund, West Germany. He was a Senior Executive of SriLankan Airlines.

Rajeewa was also the Regional Manager for Qatar Airways.

References

13. ^ "Rajeewa Jayaweera - a post script for posterity"
http://www.lankaweb.com/news/items/2020/06/15/rajeewa-jayaweera-a-postscript-for-posterity/

14. Rajeewa Jayaweera
https://island.lk/rajeewa-jayaweera/

15. Getting to know my brother better after his far too early exit from this world
http://www.sundaytimes.lk/210606/plus/appreciations-4-445876.html

16. How public sector corruption withers national economy: RJ's insight
http://island.lk/how-public-sector-corruption-withers-national-economy-rjs-insight/

17. An appreciation: Rajeewa Jayaweera - a void hard to fill
https://island.lk/an-appreciation-rajeewa-jayaweera-a-void-hard-to-fill/

18. ^Remembering my brother Rajeewa Jayaweera^
https://island.lk/remembering-my-brother-rajeewa-jayaweera/

19. The Rajeewa Jayaweera I knew
https://island.lk/the-rajeewa-jayaweera-i-knew/

External links
 Rajeewa Jayaweera’s death: No doubt it was suicide – Sibling
 Ex-SriLankan Airlines Senior Official Mr. Rajeewa Jayaweera Found Dead
 Man found dead at Ind. Square identified as former SL Airlines Manager & freelance writer
 Death of former SriLankan Airlines official whose body found near the Independence Square suspected suicide
 Remains found at Independence Square revealed to be of ex-SriLankan executive
 Rajeewa Jayaweera: A postscript for posterity
 Saudi Arabia takes a stand

Alumni of Nalanda College, Colombo
Sri Lankan Buddhists
Sinhalese journalists
2020 deaths